Hostivař is a cadastral area in southern Prague.

References

External links 

Districts of Prague